Roland Jourdain, often nicknamed "Bilou" is a French professional yachtsman, born on 28 April 1964 in Quimper. He is notably two-time winner of the Route du Rhum.

Race Result Highlights

Round the World Races
DNF 2008–2009 Vendée Globe keel failure on day 85 of the race
DNF 2004–2005 Vendée Globe keel problems
3rd 2000–2001 Vendée Globe (onboard Sill)
1989 Whitbread on Fazisi
1985 Whitbread with Éric Tabarly on the yacht Côte d’Or56

Other IMOCA 60 Events

1st – 2010 Route du Rhum 
1st – 2006 Route du Rhum 
4th – 2002 Route du Rhum (onboard IMOCA 60 Sill)

Other Event
1st – 1995 Transat Jacques Vabre with  

6th – 1997 Solitaire du Figaro
6th – 1996 Solitaire du Figaro
3rd – 1993 Solitaire du Figaro
3rd – 1994 Solitaire du Figaro

References

External links 
 Official Twitter Account 
 

1964 births
Living people
Sportspeople from Quimper
IMOCA 60 class sailors
French male sailors (sport)
Vendée Globe finishers
2000 Vendee Globe sailors
2004 Vendee Globe sailors
2008 Vendee Globe sailors
French Vendee Globe sailors
Single-handed circumnavigating sailors